is a passenger railway station in located in the city of Wakayama, Wakayama Prefecture, Japan, operated by West Japan Railway Company (JR West).

Lines
Hoshiya Station is served by the Wakayama Line, and is located 79.9 kilometers from the terminus of the line at Ōji Station.

Station layout
The station consists of two opposed side platforms connected by an open footbridge. The station is unattended.

Platforms

Adjacent stations

|-

History
Hoshiya Station opened on May 3, 1899 as a temporary stop on the Kiwa Railway and raised to full passenger station on October 1. The line was sold to the Kansai Railway in 1904, which was subsequently nationalized in 1907. With the privatization of the Japan National Railways (JNR) on April 1, 1987, the station came under the aegis of the West Japan Railway Company.

Passenger statistics
In fiscal 2019, the station was used by an average of 352 passengers daily (boarding passengers only).

Surrounding area
Wakayama City Takazumi Junior High School
JR Freight Wakayama Off Rail Station
Hoshiya Station Square Park

See also
List of railway stations in Japan

References

External links

 Hoshiya Station Official Site

Railway stations in Wakayama Prefecture
Railway stations in Japan opened in 1899
Wakayama (city)